Hiatellidae is a taxonomic family of saltwater clams, marine bivalve molluscs. This family is placed in the order Adapedonta.

Genera
Genera within the family Hiatellidae include:
 Cyrtodaria Reuss, 1801    
 Hiatella Bosc, 1801
 Panomya Gray, 1857    
 Panopea Menard, 1807
 Saxicavella P. Fischer, 1878

References

 
 Powell A. W. B., New Zealand Mollusca, William Collins Publishers Ltd, Auckland, New Zealand 1979 

 
Bivalve families